The 1983 European Curling Championships were held from 4 to 10 December at the Rocklundahallen arena in Västerås, Sweden.

The Swiss men's team skipped by Amédéé Biner won their fourth European title, and the Swedish women's team skipped by Elisabeth Högström won their sixth European title.

For the first time, the women's team of Finland took part in the European Championship.

Men's

Teams

Round robin
Group A

Group B

  Teams to playoffs

Ranking games for 5th-14th places

Playoffs

Final standings

Women's

Teams

Round robin
Group A

Group B

  Teams to playoffs
  Teams to tiebreaker

Tiebreaker

Ranking games for 5th-14th places

Playoffs

Final standings

References

European Curling Championships, 1983
European Curling Championships, 1983
European Curling Championships
Curling competitions in Sweden
International sports competitions hosted by Sweden
European Curling Championships
European Curling Championships